Praprotna Polica is a village in the Municipality of Cerklje na Gorenjskem in the Upper Carniola region of Slovenia.

References

External links

Praprotna Polica on Geopedia

Populated places in the Municipality of Cerklje na Gorenjskem